"Temper Temper" is a song by English musician Goldie, released as the second single from his 1998 album Saturnz Return. It features Noel Gallagher on guitar.

The song reached number 13 on the UK Singles Chart on 24 January 1998 which is Goldie's highest-charting single along with "Digital" (featuring KRS-One). It uses aggressive guitar melodies played by Gallagher and Goldie's own aggressive singing and stands as one of the most rock and industrial-influenced songs in the musician's career. Although never an Oasis fan favourite, it was received positively by Goldie and Noel Gallagher.

There was a music video released which featured both Goldie and Gallagher and also various scenes with people fighting, disturbing and breaking objects.

Track listing 
Side A
"Temper Temper"
"Temper Temper" (VIP mix)	

Side B
"Temper Temper" (Grooverider remix)

Personnel 
 Goldie – vocals, production, keyboards
 Noel Gallagher – guitars
 Tim Philbert – bass
 Trevor Moray – drums, programming
 Mark Hobbs – engineering, guitars

Charts

References

External links 
Music video

1997 songs
1997 singles
Goldie songs
Noel Gallagher songs
FFRR Records singles